Kundt is a small, bowl-shaped lunar impact crater in the northern section of the Mare Nubium. It was named after the German physicist August Kundt. Prior to that it was designated Guericke C. It has a raised rim and is not significantly worn due to impact erosion. This crater lies part way between Guericke to the west and Davy in the east.

References

External links

Kundt at The Moon Wiki

Impact craters on the Moon